John Kenneth Kirkham (13 May 1941 – 11 February 2021) was an English professional footballer who played as a wing half.

Club career
Born in Wednesbury, Kirkham began his career with Wolverhampton Wanderers in 1956, turning professional in 1958 and making his first team debut in 1959. He also played in the 1957–58 FA Youth Cup.

He later played for Peterborough United, Exeter City, Durban Spurs and Horwich RMI.

International career
He played for England at youth and under-23 levels.

Later life and death
He retired to South Africa but returned to England after the death of his wife, and lived in Wigan. He died on 11 February 2021, aged 79.

References

1941 births
2021 deaths
Sportspeople from Wednesbury
English footballers
England youth international footballers
England under-23 international footballers
Association football wing halves
Wolverhampton Wanderers F.C. players
Peterborough United F.C. players
Exeter City F.C. players
Addington F.C. players
Leigh Genesis F.C. players
English Football League players
English expatriate footballers
English expatriates in South Africa
Expatriate soccer players in South Africa